Sir George Ruthven Le Hunte  (20 August 1852 – 29 January 1925) was a British politician. He served as Governor of South Australia from 1 July 1903 until 18 February 1909, soon after federation of Australia.

Life
He was born in Porthgain, Pembrokeshire, Wales, the son of George and Mary Le Hunte. He was educated at Eton College and Trinity College, Cambridge.

Le Hunte served as President of Dominica (1887–94), secretary of Barbados (1894–97) and Mauritius (1897); and Lieutenant-Governor of British New Guinea (1899–1903). He was Governor of South Australia 1903–08/9, and then Governor of Trinidad and Tobago from 1908 to 1915, retiring 1916.

As South Australian Governor, Le Hunte became the first patron of the Royal Automobile Association of South Australia when it was formed in 1903. The District Council of Le Hunte in the north of Eyre Peninsula was named after him before it was changed to Wudinna District Council in 2008.

Family
George Le Hunte married Caroline Rachel Clowes (c. 1854 – 18 May 1939) on 14 February 1884; she was a cousin of Evelyn May Clowes. They had two children:

John Le Hunte (11 August 1886 – ) married Vera Spurgin, daughter of John Henry Spurgin, on 12 August 1913. While there were reports of his being killed in action early in World War I, he was a prisoner of war; during World War II he worked in the Air Ministry.
Editha Rachel Le Hunte (c. October 1892 – ) married Godfrey Barton Pease (15 May 1887 – ) on 5 October 1912. Details of his death in WWI have also been hard to find. Other reports indicate they both survived to 1919 at least.
Lt.-Col. Godfrey Philip Desmond Pease (19 September 1913 – 8 March 2007)
Ann Pease ( – ) married Lt.-Col. William Eliott Lockhart

References

Diane Langmore, 'Le Hunte, Sir George Ruthven (1852–1925)', Australian Dictionary of Biography, Volume 10, MUP, 1986, pp 66–67.

External links
World Statesmen – Trinindad and Tobago
World Statesmen – Dominica
World Statesmen – Papua New guinea
 

Governors of South Australia
Governors of Trinidad and Tobago
1852 births
1925 deaths
Knights Grand Cross of the Order of St Michael and St George
Colonial Administrative Service officers
People from Pembrokeshire
Governors of the Territory of Papua
Colonial Secretaries of Barbados